In the 10th edition of Systema Naturae, Carl Linnaeus classified the arthropods, including insects, arachnids and crustaceans, among his class "Insecta". He described the Insecta as:
A very numerous and various class consisting of small animals, breathing through lateral spiracles, armed on all sides with a bony skin, or covered with hair; furnished with many feet, and moveable antennae (or horns), which project from the head, and are the probable instruments of sensation.

Linnaean Characteristics 
Heart: 1 auricle, 0 ventricles. Cold, pus-like blood.
Spiracles: lateral pores
Jaw: lateral
Penis: penetrates
Organs of Sense: tongue, eyes, antennae on head, no brain, no ears, no nostrils
Covering: a bony coat of mail
Supports: feet, and in some, wings. Skips on dry ground and buzzes

Orders

Linnaeus divided the class Insecta into seven orders, based chiefly on the form of the wings. He also provided a key to the orders:
4 wings
pairs dissimilar
forewings fully hardened: Coleoptera
forewings partly hardened: Hemiptera
pairs similar
wings covered with flat scales: Lepidoptera
wings membranous
Tail unarmed: Neuroptera
Tail bearing a sting: Hymenoptera
2 wings: Diptera
0 wings: Aptera

Despite this key, however, Linnaeus grouped insects together that shared other affinities. His genus Coccus, containing the scale insects, he placed among the 4-winged Hemiptera, along with aphids and other plant-attacking insects, even though females have no wings, and males have two wings. Similarly, the sheep ked Hippobosca ovina (now Melophagus ovinus) was correctly placed among the Diptera, despite being wingless.

Genera
Coleoptera: Scarabaeus (scarab beetles), Dermestes (larder beetles), Hister (clown beetles), Attelabus (leaf-rolling weevils), Curculio (true weevils), Silpha (carrion beetles), Coccinella (ladybirds or ladybugs), Cassida (tortoise beetles), Chrysomela (leaf beetles), Meloe (blister beetles), Tenebrio (darkling beetles), Mordella (tumbling flower beetles), Staphylinus (rove beetles), Cerambyx (longhorn beetles), Cantharis (soldier beetles), Elater (click beetles), Cicindela (ground beetles), Buprestis (jewel beetles), Dytiscus (Dytiscidae), Carabus, Necydalis (necydaline beetles), Forficula (earwigs), Blatta (cockroaches) and Gryllus (other orthopteroid insects)
Hemiptera: Cicada (cicadas), Notonecta (backswimmers), Nepa (water scorpions), Cimex (bedbugs), Aphis (aphids), Chermes (woolly aphids), Coccus (scale insects) and Thrips (thrips)
Lepidoptera: Papilio (butterflies), Sphinx (hawk moths), Phalaena (moths)
Neuroptera: Libellula (dragonflies and damselflies), Ephemera (mayflies), Phryganea (caddisflies), Hemerobius (lacewings), Panorpa (scorpionflies) and Raphidia (snakeflies)
Hymenoptera: Cynips (Gall wasps), Tenthredo (sawflies), Ichneumon (ichneumon wasps), Sphex (digger wasps), Vespa (hornets), Apis (bees), Formica (ants) and Mutilla (velvet ants)
Diptera: Oestrus (botflies), Tipula (crane flies), Musca (house flies), Tabanus (horse flies), Culex (mosquitoes), Empis (dance flies), Conops (thick-headed flies), Asilus (robber flies), Bombylius (bee flies) and Hippobosca (louse flies)
Aptera: Lepisma (silverfish), Podura (springtails), Termes (termites), Pediculus (lice), Pulex (fleas), Acarus (mites and ticks), Phalangium (harvestmen), Aranea (spiders), Scorpio (scorpions), Cancer (crabs, lobsters and kin), Monoculus (water fleas and kin), Oniscus (woodlice), Scolopendra (centipedes) and Julus (millipedes)

References

Systema Naturae
Systema Naturae, Insecta
Systema Naturae, Insecta